The 2022–23 George Mason Patriots Men's basketball team represented George Mason University during the 2022–23 NCAA Division I men's basketball season. The season was the 57th for the program, the second under head coach Kim English, and the tenth as members of the Atlantic 10 Conference. The Patriots played their home games at EagleBank Arena in Fairfax, Virginia.

This was the first season since 2017 that the Patriots finished the season with at least 20 wins.

Previous season
In Kim English's first season as head coach, the Patriots finished the 2021–22 season 14–16, 7–9 in A-10 play to finish in ninth place. Their season ended with a loss to Fordham in the second round of the A-10 tournament.

Offseason

Departures

Arrivals

Source

Honors and awards
All Atlantic 10 First Team
 Josh Oduro 

Atlantic 10 Player of the Week
 Josh Oduro - Jan. 16 
 Josh Oduro - Feb. 20

Roster

Player statistics

Schedule and results

|-
!colspan=12 style=| Non-conference regular season

|-
!colspan=12 style=| A-10 regular season

|-
!colspan=12 style=| A-10 tournament

|-

Source

References

George Mason
George Mason Patriots men's basketball seasons
George Mason men's basketball
George Mason men's basketball